The RBU-1000 Smerch-3  is a 300 mm caliber Russian anti-submarine and anti-torpedo rocket launcher. It entered service around 1962–1963. It is similar in operation to the Hedgehog system used during the Second World War. The RBU-1000 is remotely aimed by the Burya fire control system (which is also used by the RBU-6000 system). It is crewed by three men, two in the magazine room, one in the control center.

The launcher consists of six barrels which are automatically loaded one at a time from a below deck magazine that holds either 60 or 48 rounds per launcher. The system's reaction time is around two minutes between initial target detection and the first salvo reaching the target, though this can be reduced to under one minute if some target data is pre-entered (for example depth and speed). A salvo consists of 1, 2, 4 or 6 RGB-10 rockets, with a gap of around a second between successive rockets. Reloading takes less than three minutes.

The rockets travel in a ballistic arc and strike the water, sinking rapidly and are either detonated when reaching a depth set at launch or on impact with a target.

RBU-1000 were used extensively and often it would operate side by side with a RBU-6000 

RBU-1000 are Currently used, on Kashin class destroyers (Project 61).

Specifications

Launcher
 Weight: 2900 kg
 Length: 2165 mm
 Width: 2000 mm
 Height: 2030 mm
 Traverse rate: 30 °/sec
Crew: 4

RGB-10 (РГБ-10) rocket
 Range: 100 m to 1000 m
 Weight: 195 kg
 Warhead:100 kg
 Caliber: 300 mm
 Length: 1800 mm
 Sink rate: 11.8 m/s
 Maximum depth: 450 m

References
 The Naval Institute Guide to World Naval Systems 1997-1998
 Warfare.ru Smerch system

Naval weapons of the Cold War
Anti-submarine missiles
Cold War weapons of the Soviet Union
Military equipment introduced in the 1960s